Audit Wales, formally the Wales Audit Office (WAO), is an independent public body which was established by the Senedd (Welsh Parliament; , formerly the National Assembly for Wales) on 1 April 2005. It has overall responsibility for auditing on behalf of the Auditor General for Wales, across all sectors of government in Wales, except those reserved to the UK government.

Function 
Their aim is to ensure that the people of Wales know whether public money is being managed wisely and that public bodies in Wales understand how to improve outcomes.

This overall aim is supported by four key objectives:

 Provide timely assurance on governance and stewardship of public money and assets
 Offer useful insight on the extent to which resources are used well in meeting people's needs
 Clearly identify and promote ways to which the provision of public services may be improved
 Be an accountable, well-run and efficient organisation that provides a stimulating and rewarding environment to work
Audit Wales currently audits around 800 public bodies including the Welsh Government, NHS Wales, and local government.

Structure 

Audit Wales takes the form of a statutory board, which employs staff, secures resources and monitors and advises the Auditor General. The Senedd appoints the Chair and 3 other non-executive members to the board. The other members are the Auditor General and 3 employees.  
Audit Wales currently employ around 240 people across 3 offices in Cardiff, Swansea and Ewloe.

History 
On 1 July 1999, The National Assembly for Wales (Transfer of Functions) Order 1999 came into effect, this transferred all powers from the Secretary of State for Wales to the Senedd. Wales did not have its own auditing body, as all public auditing was carried out by the National Audit Office and the Audit Commission. It was not until 1 April 2005 that Audit Wales was created after the Public Audit (Wales) Act 2004 came into effect.

Legislation 
The Public Audit (Wales) Act 2004, the Government of Wales Act 1998 and Government of Wales Act 2006 and other legislation currently provide the statutory basis for the Auditor General and the auditors he appoints in local government to fulfill their purpose across the Welsh public sector. In 2012 the Welsh Government introduced before the National Assembly the Public Audit (Wales) Bill. One feature of the Bill as currently drafted is to make provision for the Auditor General to be the statutory auditor of local government bodies.

See also 
 National Audit Office (United Kingdom)
 Audit Scotland
 Public Accounts Commission

Notes

External links 

Government of Wales
2005 establishments in Wales
Wales
Auditing in the United Kingdom
Auditing organizations